The Central Railroad of New Jersey, also known as the New Jersey Central or Jersey Central Lines , was a Class I railroad with origins in the 1830s. It was absorbed into Conrail in April 1976 along with several other prominent bankrupt railroads of the Northeastern United States.

History

The earliest railroad ancestor of the CNJ was the Elizabethtown & Somerville Railroad, incorporated in 1831 and opened from Elizabethport to Elizabeth, New Jersey in 1836. Horses gave way to steam in 1839, and the railroad was extended west, reaching Somerville at the beginning of 1842. The Somerville & Easton Railroad was incorporated in 1847 and began building westward. In 1849 it purchased the Elizabethtown & Somerville and adopted a new name: Central Railroad Company of New Jersey. The line reached Phillipsburg, on the east bank of the Delaware River, in 1852. It was extended east across Newark Bay to Jersey City in 1864, and it gradually acquired branches to Flemington, Newark, Perth Amboy, Chester, and Wharton.

The New Jersey Southern (NJS) began construction in 1860 at Port Monmouth. The railroad worked its way southwest across lower New Jersey and reached Bayside, on the Delaware River west of Bridgeton, New Jersey in 1871. The NJS came under control of the CNJ in 1879. CNJ's influence briefly extended across the Delaware River in the form of the Baltimore & Delaware Bay Railroad, from Bombay Hook, Delaware, east of Townsend, to Chestertown, Maryland. That line became part of the Pennsylvania Railroad (PRR) family in 1901.

CNJ's lines in Pennsylvania were built by the Lehigh Coal & Navigation Company as the Lehigh & Susquehanna Railroad (L&S). The main line was completed between Phillipsburg, New Jersey and Wilkes-Barre in 1866. A notable feature of the line was the Ashley Planes, a steep stretch of line (maximum grade was 14.65%) operated by cables driven by stationary engines, which remained in service until after World War II (WWII). CNJ leased the L&S in 1871. The line was extended to Scranton in 1888 by a subsidiary of the L&S, the Wilkes-Barre & Scranton; L&S leased the line upon completion and assigned the lease to the CNJ. The bulk of the traffic on the Pennsylvania lines was anthracite coal, much of it produced by subsidiaries of the railroad, until the Commodities Clause of the Interstate Commerce Act of 1920 forbade railroads to haul freight in which they had an interest.

From 1883 to 1887 the CNJ was leased to and operated by the Philadelphia & Reading Railroad, with which it formed a New York-Philadelphia route. CNJ resumed its own management after reorganization in 1887. In 1901, the Reading Company (RDG), successor to the Philadelphia & Reading, acquired control of the CNJ through purchase of a majority of its stock, and at about the same time Baltimore & Ohio Railroad (B&O) acquired control of the RDG, gaining access to New York over RDG and CNJ rails.

In 1929, CNJ inaugurated the Blue Comet, a deluxe coach train operating twice daily between Jersey City and Atlantic City. It was painted blue from the pilot of its 4-6-2 to the rear bulkhead of its observation car, and its refurbished cars offered a level of comfort much higher than the usual day coach of the era. The train was the forerunner of the coach streamliners that blossomed nationwide in the late 1930s and the 1940s. It succumbed to automobile competition in 1941. Also in 1929 CNJ purchased a 30 percent interest in the Raritan River Railroad, a 12-mile (19 km) short line from Perth Amboy to New Brunswick. In 1931 it acquired total ownership of the Wharton & Northern Railroad and a partial interest in the Mount Hope Mineral Railroad from Warren Foundry & Pipe Corporation.

The lines in Pennsylvania were organized as the Central Railroad of Pennsylvania (CRP) in 1946 in an effort to escape taxation by the state of New Jersey. CNJ resumed its own operation of the Pennsylvania lines at the end of 1952. The CRP continued in existence as owner of the Easton & Western, four miles of track in Easton, Pennsylvania.

When the Lehigh & New England Railroad was abandoned in 1961 CNJ acquired a few of its branches and organized them as the Lehigh & New England Railway. In 1963 Lehigh Coal & Navigation sold its railroad properties to the RDG, but the lease to the CNJ continued. In 1965 CNJ and the Lehigh Valley Railroad consolidated their lines along the Lehigh River in Pennsylvania and portions of each railroad's line were abandoned; the anthracite traffic that had supported both railroads had largely disappeared. CNJ operations in Pennsylvania ended March 31, 1972.

CNJ maintained a small carfloat terminal in The Bronx. It was the site of the first successful Class 1 railroad diesel operation. Over the years CNJ maintained an extensive marine operation on New York Bay, including a steamer line to Sandy Hook. CNJ's last marine service, the ferry line between Manhattan and CNJ's rail terminal at Jersey City, made its last run on April 30, 1967. It was also the last day for the terminal itself; the next day CNJ passenger trains began originating and terminating at the PRR station in Newark via the Aldene Connection, where New York passengers could transfer to either PRR or Port Authority Trans-Hudson (PATH) trains.

Decline
The years after WWII were not kind to CNJ. Passenger traffic was almost entirely commuter business, requiring great amounts of rolling stock for two short periods five days a week. Three-fourths of CNJ's freight traffic terminated on line — the railroad was essentially a terminal carrier, which meant little profit was made, if any. In addition, heavy taxes levied by the state of New Jersey ate up much of CNJ's revenue. The state of New Jersey began subsidizing commuter service in 1964, and the tax situation changed in 1967. 

The merger between the Chesapeake & Ohio and Norfolk & Western railways that was proposed in 1965 to counter the impending PRR-New York Central Railroad merger was to have included CNJ, but the bankruptcy of Penn Central killed that prospect. CNJ drafted elaborate plans for reorganization; they came to naught as neighboring railroads collapsed. Conrail took over freight operations of the CNJ on April 1, 1976; with passenger routes transferred to the New Jersey Department of Transportation including the present New Jersey Transit North Jersey Coast Line and Raritan Valley Line.

CNJ emerged from bankruptcy in 1979 as Central Jersey Industries (later CJI Industries), a corporate shell. It merged with the packaging company Triangle Industries, owned by Nelson Peltz, in 1986.

Main initial corridors
CNJ had its northeastern terminus at Elizabethport, New Jersey. In 1864 CNJ extended its railroad across the bay into Bayonne, and north to the Jersey City terminus. It had used a succession of bridges over the years, the last being Newark Bay Bridge, demolished in the 1980s.

From Elizabethport, trains went to different corridors. One headed towards Elizabeth and Plainfield and points west and southwest. The second went south towards Perth Amboy and today's North Jersey Coast Line and different southern New Jersey destinations. CNJ operated several trains into Pennsylvania and other points west or south, in association with the RDG. B&O also used CNJ tracks for the final approach to Jersey City.

Portions still operated
Aldene-High Bridge (Main Line): New Jersey Transit (NJT) Raritan Valley Line
Perth Amboy-Bay Head: NJT North Jersey Coast Line
Elizabethport-Aldene; Elizabethport-Perth Amboy; Jersey City-Bayonne; Red Bank-Lakehurst: Conrail Shared Assets Operations
Lakehurst-Woodmansie: Cape May Seashore Lines
Winslow Junction-Vineland: Southern Railroad of New Jersey
Dover & Rockaway Branch (Wharton-Rockaway); High Bridge Branch (Kenvil-Flanders): Morristown & Erie Railway

Gallery

Predecessor railroads
Buena Vista Railroad
Carteret & Sewaren Railroad
Carteret Extension Railroad
Cumberland & Maurice River Railroad
Cumberland & Maurice River Extension Railroad
Elizabeth Extension Railroad
Freehold & Atlantic Highlands Railroad
Lafayette Railroad
Manufacturers' Extension Railroad
Middle Brook Railroad
New Jersey Terminal Railroad
New Jersey Southern Railroad
Navesink Railroad
Passaic River Extension Railroad
Raritan North Shore Railroad
Sound Shore Railroad
Toms River Railroad
Toms River & Barnegat Railroad
Vineland Railroad
Vineland Branch Railway
West Side Connecting Railroad
West End Railroad

Named passenger trains
CNJ operated several named trains, most of which were interstate operations:
Blue Comet: Jersey City, New Jersey-Atlantic City, New Jersey
Bullet: Jersey City-Wilkes-Barre, Pennsylvania via Allentown, Pennsylvania
Crusader: Jersey City-Philadelphia, Pennsylvania (with RDG)
Interstate Express: Syracuse, New York-Philadelphia, Pennsylvania (with the Delaware, Lackawanna & Western Railroad and RDG)
Mermaid: Sandy Hook, New Jersey-Scranton, Pennsylvania
Queen of the Valley: Jersey City-Harrisburg, Pennsylvania (with RDG)
Wall Street: Jersey City-Philadelphia, Pennsylvania (with RDG)
Williamsporter: Jersey City, New Jersey-Williamsport, Pennsylvania

Several non-CNJ trains operated over CNJ trackage north of Bound Brook, New Jersey to the Jersey City terminal:
Capitol Limited: Jersey City, New Jersey-Chicago, Illinois (B&O)
National Limited: Jersey City, New Jersey-St. Louis, Missouri (B&O)
Royal Blue: Jersey City, New Jersey-Washington, D.C. (B&O)

Heritage Units 

As a part of Norfolk Southern's 30th anniversary in 2012, the company painted 20 new locomotives into predecessor schemes.  NS #1071, an EMD SD70ACe locomotive, was painted into the Central Railroad of New Jersey orange and blue.

In 2019, NJ Transit unveiled locomotive 4109 painted in a heritage scheme based on that of the CNJ GP40P.

See also

Central Railroad of Pennsylvania
SS Asbury Park, a crack coastal steamer built for the CNJ in 1903, and subsequently rebuilt and operated as a car ferry in San Francisco Bay (1919 to 1940), Puget Sound (1943 to 1951), and the Strait of Georgia (1952 to 1976)

References

Further reading

 
Railway companies established in 1849
Railway companies disestablished in 1976
Former Class I railroads in the United States
Standard gauge railways in the United States
Companies affiliated with the Reading Company
Railroads transferred to Conrail
Defunct New Jersey railroads
Defunct Pennsylvania railroads
Predecessors of Conrail
Conrail
1849 establishments in New Jersey